The common rain spider (Palystes superciliosus), formerly P. natalius, is a species of huntsman spider native to Southern Africa. It is the most common and widespread species in the genus Palystes. In South Africa its distribution ranges from KwaZulu-Natal province in the east, then westwards to the provinces of Mpumalanga, Limpopo, Gauteng and North West in the north, and Eastern Cape and Western Cape in the south. It has a body length of 15–36 mm and a leg span of up to 110mm. The species was first described by Ludwig Carl Christian Koch in 1875.

Its preferred habitat is scrubland and savannah woodland. Spiders in the genus Palystes are commonly called rain spiders, or lizard-eating spiders. Palystes spiders will often enter homes before rain, where they will prey on geckos (usually Afrogecko porphyreus in Gauteng, the Western Cape, or Lygodactylus capensis in the eastern parts of southern Africa). Males are regularly seen from August to December, probably looking for females.

After mating in the early summer, the female constructs a round egg sac about 60–100 mm in size made of silk, with twigs and leaves woven into it. These egg sacs are commonly seen from about November to April. The female constructs the sac over 3–5 hours, then aggressively guards it until the spiderlings, who hatch inside the protective sac, chew their way out about three weeks later. Females will construct about three of these egg sacs over their two-year lives. Many gardeners are bitten by protective Palystes mothers during this period.

The size of these spiders, combined with the yellow and black banding on the underside of the legs exposed when the spider is in threat pose, give them a fearsome appearance. An experiment was done in 1959 where a Palystes superciliosus was allowed to bite an adult guinea pig on the nose. The guinea pig died within 7 minutes, leading to a belief that the spider's venom was dangerous. However, further research on anaesthetized guinea pigs showed that the original guinea pig had actually died of shock, rather than as a result of the spider's venom. In humans the bite is no more dangerous than a bee sting. It causes a burning sensation, and swelling which lasts for a few days. Recovery is spontaneous and complete.

P. superciliosus (and other Palystes spiders) are also commonly seen paralysed, being dragged by a large wasp called a Pompilid wasp. Sometimes the wasp will not be present. Pompilid wasps only hunt spiders, which they paralyse by stinging them. They then drag the spider back to their nest where they lay an egg on the spider, then seal the spider and the egg in. When the egg hatches, the larva eats the paralysed spider, keeping the spider alive as long as possible by eating peripheral flesh first, and saving the vital organs till last. By doing this, the spider stays fresh long enough for the wasp larva to mature and pupate. The Pompilid wasp species Tachypompilus ignitus is at least largely a specialist hunter of mature Palystes females.

Gallery

References

External links
 Palystes (rain spiders, lizard-eating spiders) on Iziko Museums' Biodiversity Explorer

Spiders of South Africa
Sparassidae
Spiders described in 1875